Noah Edward Edgerton House is a historic home located at Selma, Johnston County, North Carolina.  It was built in 1896, and is a two-story, three bay, Queen Anne style frame dwelling.  It features a three-story corner turret, asymmetrical massing, and an ornate, one-story wraparound porch.

It was listed on the National Register of Historic Places in 1982.

References

Houses on the National Register of Historic Places in North Carolina
Queen Anne architecture in North Carolina
Houses completed in 1896
Houses in Johnston County, North Carolina
National Register of Historic Places in Johnston County, North Carolina